Sunnycroft is a historic house on Locust Hill in the center of Limerick, Maine.  Built in 1921–22, it is a picturesque and rambling exposition of Colonial Revival architecture.  It was listed on the National Register of Historic Places in 1984.

Description
Sunnycroft is a -story wood-frame house, resting on a fieldstone foundation.  It is located on Locust Hill, a high spot overlooking the center of Limerick, and its foundation is exposed on the east side.  The southern facade has a significantly projecting gabled portico, supported by two-story fluted Doric columns.  This portico has a modillioned cornice, and a fanlight window in the gable pediment.  Underneath this portico, the main entry is framed by a smaller portico, which is supported by paired Doric columns (one each square and round), and topped by a balustrade with urn-topped posts.

The eastern facade of the house has a porte-cochere. The building has much asymmetrical styling, including semicircular and oval windows, and a number of single-story additions that gives the building a rambling quality, and an architectural sophistication unusual in a rural setting. The house was built by Charles G. Moulton.

References

Houses on the National Register of Historic Places in Maine
Colonial Revival architecture in Maine
Houses completed in 1922
Houses in York County, Maine
Limerick, Maine
National Register of Historic Places in York County, Maine